Johns Island is an uninhabited island within Qikiqtaaluk Region, Nunavut, Canada. An island within an island, it is located in Lake Hazen on Ellesmere Island within Quttinirpaaq National Park.

Avifauna
The long-tailed jaeger has been found to breed on Johns Island and nearby Camp Hazen.

References

Ellesmere Island
Uninhabited islands of Qikiqtaaluk Region